Carex serpenticola is a species of sedge in the family Cyperaceae, native to the US states of Oregon and California. It is found on serpentine soils.

References

serpenticola
Endemic flora of the United States
Flora of Oregon
Flora of California
Plants described in 1998
Flora without expected TNC conservation status